Nerf Herder IV is the fourth studio album by the rock band Nerf Herder. It was released in 2008 through Oglio Records.

Track listing

References

2008 albums
Nerf Herder albums